The Tagalized Movie Channel (or TMC) is a 24-hour Filipino cable channel co-owned by Viva Communications and MVP Entertainment.

TMC airs 24 hours of Asian and Hollywood movies dubbed in Tagalog language. Just like its sister channel Pinoy Box Office, They occasionally play music videos of Viva Entertainment's recording artists.

References

Viva Entertainment
Television networks in the Philippines
Movie channels in the Philippines
Filipino-language television stations
Television channels and stations established in 2014
2014 establishments in the Philippines